Imma confluens is a moth in the family Immidae. It was described by Edward Meyrick in 1931. It is found in Brazil, Venezuela and French Guiana.

References

Moths described in 1931
Immidae
Moths of South America